Readings by Jack Kerouac on the Beat Generation is the third and final spoken word album by the American novelist and poet Jack Kerouac, released in January 1960 on Verve Records. The album was recorded during 1959, prior to the publication of Kerouac's sixth novel, Doctor Sax.

Composition
Jack Kerouac had released Poetry for the Beat Generation and Blues and Haikus (1959) following the publication of The Dharma Bums. Both albums featured jazz-based accompaniment, however, for Readings by Jack Kerouac on the Beat Generation, Kerouac had decided to record the album solely in spoken word. Despite having no musical accompaniment, biographer Gerald Nicosia stated that "the musicality of Kerouac's art is best exemplified by the Readings album."

Several readings on the album are from several of Kerouac's written works. The opening track, "San Francisco Scene (The Beat Generation)," is read from extracts of Desolation Angels. Extracts from the eponymous novel The Subterraneans and poetry collection San Francisco Blues are also featured. "Visions of Neal" features extracts from the original drafts of Kerouac's most notable novel On the Road.

Packaging
The front cover of the album features a picture of Kerouac tuning a radio, taken by photographer and musician John Cohen and other photography by Robert Frank is featured elsewhere on the album's artwork. Readings by Jack Kerouac on the Beat Generation also included liner notes written by Jack Kerouac's close friend and fellow Beat writer Allen Ginsberg. Later CD pressings of the album reproduced Ginsberg's liner notes on fifteen illustrated postcards, addressed to Kerouac.

Release
Readings by Jack Kerouac on the Beat Generation was released in January 1960 on Verve Records on LP. In June 1990, Rhino Entertainment reissued the album on CD as part of the box set The Jack Kerouac Collection, also featuring Poetry for the Beat Generation, Blues and Haikus and The Last Word. The CD reissue included a bonus track, "Is There a Beat Generation?", a live lecture by Kerouac to students of Hunter College in Manhattan, New York on November 6, 1958. A remastered CD version was issued on October 28, 1997 on Verve Records.

Upon its release, the album received minimal critical reception. Allmusic reviewer Bruce Eder has since called Readings by Jack Kerouac on the Beat Generation "a solo performance that transcends poetry and music" and added "it's literally spoken jazz [...] Kerouac's most musical performance [...] using his voice and language the way a saxophonist might improvise on a particular melodic line or riff. He's spellbinding throughout, intense, focused, and even subtly changing voices with the work itself." Eder awarded the album a full five-star rating. The album was later nominated for the 1999 Grammy Award for Best Recording Package.

Track listing

Personnel
All personnel credits adapted from the album's liner notes.

Performer
Jack Kerouac – voice

Technical personnel
Bill Randle – producer
Fred W. Meyer – mastering
Richard Seidel – executive producer
Aric Lach Morrison – producer
Robert Silverburg – assistant producer
Michael Lang – supervisor
Ben Young – technician

Design personnel
Robert Frank – photography
John Cohen – photography
Allen Ginsberg – photography, liner notes
Randy Hutton – liner notes
Peter Pullman – liner notes editor
Chika Azuma – art direction, design
Nichell Delvaille – design

Notes
A  Denotes personnel on the 1990 CD reissue.

References

1960 albums
Jack Kerouac albums
Albums produced by Bob Thiele